Daniel Scott “Danny” Lux (born June 5, 1969) is an American composer who has contributed music for television and film productions.

Film credits include Halloween: Resurrection and Stolen Summer (both in 2002). TV series credits include theme music for Sliders, Million Dollar Mysteries, Crisis Center (first Emmy nomination), Profiler (second Emmy nomination), and Boston Legal. Additional series to which Lux has contributed music include My Name Is Earl (with Mark Leggett), Boston Legal, Grey's Anatomy, Karen Sisco, Hack, Ally McBeal (one BMI win), Boston Public, NYPD Blue (two BMI wins, both shared with Mike Post), John Doe, Sabrina, the Teenage Witch, The Good Wife, Melrose Place, Dawson's Creek, Suits, Magic's Biggest Secrets Finally Revealed, Mistresses, and Manifest.

References

External links

American film score composers
Place of birth missing (living people)
American television composers
Living people
1969 births
Varèse Sarabande Records artists